Events from the year 1925 in Michigan.

Office holders

State office holders
 Governor of Michigan: Alex J. Groesbeck (Republican)
 Lieutenant Governor of Michigan: George W. Welsh (Republican) 
 Michigan Attorney General: Andrew B. Dougherty (Republican)
 Michigan Secretary of State: Charles J. DeLand (Republican)
 Speaker of the Michigan House of Representatives: Fred B. Wells (Republican)
 Majority Leader of the Michigan Senate: 
 Chief Justice, Michigan Supreme Court:

Mayors of major cities
 Mayor of Detroit: John W. Smith 
 Mayor of Grand Rapids: Elvin Swarthout
 Mayor of Flint: Judson L. Transue
 Mayor of Lansing: Alfred H. Doughty

Federal office holders
 U.S. Senator from Michigan: James J. Couzens (Republican)
 U.S. Senator from Michigan: Woodbridge N. Ferris (Democrat) 
 House District 1: John B. Sosnowski (Republican)
 House District 2: Earl C. Michener (Republican)
 House District 3: Arthur B. Williams (Republican)
 House District 4: John C. Ketcham (Republican)
 House District 5: Carl E. Mapes (Republican)
 House District 6: Grant M. Hudson (Republican)
 House District 7: Louis C. Cramton (Republican)
 House District 8: Bird J. Vincent (Republican)
 House District 9: James C. McLaughlin (Republican)
 House District 10: Roy O. Woodruff (Republican)
 House District 11: Frank D. Scott (Republican)
 House District 12: W. Frank James (Republican)
 House District 13: Clarence J. McLeod (Republican)

Population

Sports

Baseball
 1925 Detroit Tigers season – Under player-manager Ty Cobb, the Tigers compiled an 81–73 record and finished fourth in the American League. Harry Heilmann won the American League batting title and also led the league with 134 RBIs. Three Tigers finished among the top five in the league in batting average: Heilmann (1st at .393), Cobb (4th at .378), Al Wingo (5th at .370). Hooks Dauss was the Tigers' leading pitcher with a 3.14 earned run average and a 16-11 win–loss record.
 1925 Michigan Wolverines baseball season - Under head coach Ray Fisher, the Wolverines compiled a 17–8 record. George Dillman was the team captain.

American football

 1925 Detroit Panthers season – Under player-coach Jimmy Conzelman, the Panthers compiled an 8–2–2 record and finished in third place in the National Football League. The team's leading scorers were Dinger Doane (30 points) and Gus Sonnenberg (27 points).
 1925 Michigan Wolverines football team – Under head coach Fielding H. Yost, the Wolverines compiled a 7–1 record, outscored opponents by a combined score of 227 to 3, won the Big Ten Conference championship, and was ranked second in country in the Dickinson System rankings.  Quarterback Benny Friedman and left end Bennie Oosterbaan, sometimes referred to as "The Benny-to-Bennie Show," were both consensus All-Americans and became known as one of the greatest passing combinations in college football history. 
 1925 Michigan State Spartans football team – Under head coach Ralph H. Young, the Spartans compiled a 3–5 record.
 1925 Michigan State Normal Normalites football team - Under head coach Elton Rynearson, the Normalites compiled a perfect 8–0 record, shut out seven of eight opponents, won the Michigan Intercollegiate Athletic Association championship, and outscored all opponents by a combined total of 106 to 6.
 1925 Detroit Titans football team – The Titans finished with a 5–4 record in their first year under head coach and College Football Hall of Fame inductee, Gus Dorais.
 1925 Central Michigan Dragons football team - Under head coach Lester Barnard, the Central Michigan football team compiled a 4–1–3 record, shut out six of eight opponents, and outscored all opponents by a combined total of 93 to 20.
 1925 Western State Hilltoppers football team - Under head coach Earl Martineau, the Hilltoppers compiled a 6–2–1 record and outscored their opponents, 125 to 47.
 Michigan high school football championship –

Basketball

 1924–25 Western Michigan men's basketball team – Under head coach Buck Read, Western Michigan compiled a 17–4 record.
 1924–25 Michigan Wolverines men's basketball team – Under head coach E. J. Mather, the Wolverines compiled a record of 10–7. George Haggarty was the team captain and leading scorer.
 1924–25 Michigan State Spartans men's basketball - Under head coach John Kobs, the Spartans compiled a 6–13 record.
 1924–25 Detroit Titans men's basketball team – Under head coach John Barrett, the University of Detroit basketball team compiled a 6–6 record.

Ice hockey
 1924–25 Michigan Wolverines men's ice hockey team – Under coach Joseph Barss, the Wolverines compiled a 4-1-1 record.
 1924–25 Michigan State Spartans men's ice hockey team – The Spartans compiled a 0–1 record under head coach John Kobs.
 1924–25 Michigan College of Mines men's ice hockey team – The Michigan College of Mines (later renamed Michigan Technological University) team compiled a 2–4 record under head coach Leon Harvey.

Other
 Port Huron to Mackinac Boat Race – In the inaugural running of the event, the Berndida of Detroit's Bayview Yacht Club, captained by Russell Pouliot, was the winner.
 Michigan Open - Davey Robertson, the instructor at Henry Ford's course in Dearborn, won the Michigan Open on July 21 in Saginaw.

Chronology of events

January
 January 1 - Alex J. Groesbeck was sworn in for his second term as Governor of Michigan.

February

March

April

May

 May 1 - The 26-story Buhl Building in Detroit opened for occupancy.

June

July

August

September

October

November

December

Births

 January 30 - Bump Elliott, American football player, coach, and athletic director, in Detroit
 February 24 - Lynn Chandnois, American football halfback, NFL Player of the Year for 1952, in Fayette, Michigan
 March 14 - William Clay Ford Sr., last surviving grandson of Henry Ford and owner of Detroit Lions, in Detroit
 March 26 - Vesta M. Roy, Governor of New Hampshire from 1982 to 1983, in Dearborn
 April 14 - Roger Brown, social psychologist, in Detroit
 May 28 - Lucien N. Nedzi, U.S. Congressman from 1965 to 1981, in Hamtramck, Michigan
 May 28 - Martha Vickers, model and actress, in Ann Arbor
 June 27 - Wayne Terwilliger, Major League Baseball infielder from 1949 to 1960, in Clare, Michigan
 July 6 - Bill Haley, musician credited with popularizing rock and roll, in Highland Park, Michigan
 July 29 - Ted Lindsay, ice hockey player for Detroit Red Wings from 1944 to 1965, in Renfrew, Ontario
 July 31 - John Swainson, Governor of Michigan from 1961 to 1963, in Windsor, Ontario
 October 11 - Elmore Leonard, American novelist, short story writer, and screenwriter, in New Orleans
 October 31 - Charles Moore, architect and recipient of the AIA Gold Medal in 1991, in Benton Harbor, Michigan
 December 2 - Julie Harris, actress, winner of five Tony Awards, three Emmy Awards, and a Grammy Award, in Grosse Pointe
 December 5 - Donald J. Albosta, U.S. Congressman from 1979 to 1985, in Saginaw
 December 21 - Bob Rush, Major League Baseball pitcher from 1948 to 1960, in Battle Creek
 December 29 - Roman Gribbs, Mayor of Detroit from 1970 to 1974, in Detroit

Gallery of 1925 births

Deaths
 February 18 - Marion LeRoy Burton, President of the University of Michigan from 1920 to 1925, in Ann Arbor at age 50
 March 30 - William J. McConnell, Michigan native who became U.S. Senator from Idaho (1890-1891) and Governor of Idaho (1893-1897), at age 85 in Moscow, Idaho
 September 11 - Patrick H. Kelly, Lieutenant Governor (1907-1911) and U.S. Congressman (1913-1925), at age 57 in Washington, D.C.
 November 5 - Samuel Dickie, Chairman of the Prohibition Party (1887-1899), at age 74 in Albion
 November 13 - George A. Loud, U.S. Congressman (1903-1917), at age 73 in Myrtle Point, Oregon

Gallery of 1925 deaths

See also
 History of Michigan
 History of Detroit

References